Visa requirements for Solomon Islands citizens are administrative entry restrictions by the authorities of other states placed on citizens of Solomon Islands. As of 2 July 2019, Solomon Islands citizens had visa-free or visa on arrival access to 129 countries and territories, ranking the Solomon Islands passport 43rd in terms of travel freedom according to the Henley visa restrictions index.

Solomon Islands signed a mutual visa waiver agreement with Schengen Area countries on 7 October 2016.

Visa requirements map

Visa requirements

Dependent, Disputed, or Restricted territories
Unrecognized or partially recognized countries

Dependent and autonomous territories

See also
Visa policy of Solomon Islands
Solomon Islands passport

References and Notes
References

Notes

Solomon Islands
Foreign relations of the Solomon Islands